Jeannie Bell is an Australian linguist. She is an Indigenous Research Collaborations Fellow in Indigenous Languages and Linguistics at Batchelor Institute of Indigenous Tertiary Education. She has made substantial contributions to the development of Aboriginal tertiary education, and to the preservation of Indigenous Australian languages.

Jeanie Bell is a Jagera and Dulingbara woman born in 1949 in south-east Queensland, and grew up in Brisbane. After leaving school, she moved to Melbourne, Victoria, and attended Monash University. After graduating from Monash, she spent three years teaching linguistics at the Yipirnya school in Alice Springs, Northern Territory, training Aboriginal interpreters for the Institute of Aboriginal Development, and editing two books for the Aboriginal Languages Association. She also she taught Indigenous Australian language studies at the North Queensland Institute of TAFE in Cairns. In 1984 she was  appointed Lecturer in Aboriginal Studies at the Northern Rivers College of Advanced Education in New South Wales, and in 1985 she became the first coordinator of the Aboriginal and Islander Studies Unit at the University of Queensland. After this role, she returned to Alice Springs and worked at the Institute for Aboriginal Development as acting assistant director. In 1988, Bell was a member of the National Aboriginal and Islander Education Policy Task Force, and in 1990 she undertook research for the Royal Commission into Aboriginal Deaths in Custody. She has also been part of the Research Committee at the Australian Institute of Aboriginal and Torres Strait Islander Studies, and between 2004 and 2005, she worked as a linguist and researcher for the Victorian Aboriginal Corporation for Languages, based in Melbourne.

She received a master's degree in Linguistics from The University of Melbourne for her 2003 sketch grammar of the Badjala language, a variety of Gabi-Gabi spoken on Fraser Island (K'gari) on the southern coast of Queensland. She has since been closely involved in language revitalisation work focusing on Badjala and Yagara languages, and is currently involved in research on kinship and marriage in Aboriginal communities as part of a PhD at the Australian National University. Her contributions to Indigenous language maintenance and revitalisation were recognised, along with those of other founding members of the Aboriginal Languages Association, at a 2012 NAIDOC event hosted by Governor General Quentin Bryce. In 1993, she was one of six Indigenous Australians who jointly presented the Boyer Lectures for the International Year of the World's Indigenous People (IYWIP).
Although Bell is no longer a practising linguist, a scholarship exists in her name for Indigenous PhD students at the Bachelor Institute, to further her legacy in the field of transcultural knowledge creation.

Key publications 

(2007) Bell, J. Why we do what we do! Reflections of an Aboriginal linguist working on the maintenance and revival of ancestral languages. Ngoonjook: a Journal of Australian Indigenous Issues (no. 30): 12-18.

(2003). Bell, J. Australia's Indigenous Languages. Ch. 12 in Blacklines, Melbourne University Press.

(2003) Bell, J. A sketch grammar of the Badjala language of Gari (Fraser Island). Masters Thesis, University of Melbourne.

References

External links 
 https://web.archive.org/web/20160312130538/http://www.batchelor.edu.au/research/our-researchers-adjuncts/jeanie-bell/
 http://trove.nla.gov.au/people/619257?c=people

Living people
Linguists from Australia
Women linguists
Linguists of Australian Aboriginal languages
Linguists of Pama–Nyungan languages
Year of birth missing (living people)
Indigenous Australian women academics
Indigenous Australian linguists